The 2011 Des Moines mayoral election was held on November 8, 2011, to elect the mayor of Des Moines, Iowa. It saw Frank Cownie win reelection, running unopposed.

Results

References 

Des Moines
Mayoral elections in Des Moines, Iowa
Des Moines